The 2009–10 Oklahoma State Cowgirls basketball team represented Oklahoma State University in the 2009–10 NCAA Division I women's basketball season. The Cowgirls, coached by Kurt Budke, played their home games at the Gallagher-Iba Arena in Stillwater, Oklahoma. The Cowgirls, a member of the Big 12 Conference, advanced to the NCAA tournament, losing in the second round to Georgia.

Offseason
May 20: Oklahoma State added three junior college players to its roster for the 2009-10 season. Lakyn Garrison, Carolyn Blair-Mobley and Precious Robinson all signed national letters of intent to play for the cowgirls in the upcoming season. Garrison earned second-team All-American honors from the National Junior College Athletic Association. Blair-Mobley earned third-team All-American honors by the NJCAA. Robinson earned first-team All-American honors from the NJCAA. They join six incoming players in the 2009 class for the Cowgirls, Keuna Flax, Heather Howard, Desiree Jeffries, Lindsey Keller, LaSharra Riley, and Toni Young.
July 30: Oklahoma State senior Andrea Riley was one of 25 players named to the Women's Basketball Coaches Association's preseason "Wade Watch" list for the 2009-2010 season. She is one of three Big 12 players to make the list. Riley was one of just seven players on the list to appear for at least the second time.
August 20: Senior guard, Andrea Riley, was named as a 2009-10 preseason candidate for the John R. Wooden Award. Riley was one of the 31 student athletes chosen for this list. She is one of only four players from the Big 12 who were on the list.
November 18: Andrea Riley was named to the watch list for the 2009-10 Naismith Trophy. This is the third such list that Riley has appeared on this season.

Roster

Schedule
The Cowgirls are participating in the Preseason WNIT to be held on November 13 through November 22.
The Cowgirls are participating in the Junkanoo Jam to be held on November 27 and 28.

Preseason Exhibitions

Regular season

Big 12 Tournament

NCAA basketball tournament

Player stats

Awards and honors

Oklahoma State
Highest Associated Press ranking in school history at #10

Megan Byford
First Team Academic All-Big 12 Women's Basketball

Ally Clardy
First Team Academic All-Big 12 Women's Basketball

Tegan Cunningham
Second Team All-Big 12 Women's Basketball
Second Team Academic All-Big 12 Women's Basketball
Preseason WNIT All-Tournament team
Junkanoo Jam all-tournament team

Andrea Riley
AP Second Team All-American
First Team All-Big 12 Women's Basketball (Unanimous Selection)
All-time leading scorer in school history
Preseason WNIT All-Tournament team
Junkanoo Jam all-tournament team
Big 12 Women's Basketball Player of the week (November 16)
Big 12 Women's Basketball Player of the week (November 30)
Big 12 Women's Basketball Player of the week (January 11)
Nancy Lieberman Award winner

Players drafted into the WNBA

See also
Oklahoma State Cowboys
Oklahoma State Cowgirls basketball

References

External links
Official Site

Oklahoma State Cowgirls basketball seasons
Oklahoma State
Oklahoma State
2009 in sports in Oklahoma
2010 in sports in Oklahoma